Pete D'Amour is an American softball coach who is the current head coach at Virginia Tech.

Coaching career

Kennesaw State

Virginia Tech
On May 31, 2018, Pete D'Amour was announced as the new head coach of the Virginia Tech softball program.

Head coaching record

College

References

Living people
American softball coaches
Virginia Tech Hokies softball coaches
Texas A&M–Corpus Christi Islanders baseball players
Frostburg State Bobcats baseball players
Missouri Tigers softball coaches
Kennesaw State Owls softball coaches
Year of birth missing (living people)